Frank Walshe (30 September 1904 – 14 June 1962) was a former Australian rules footballer who played with Carlton and Footscray in the Victorian Football League (VFL).

Notes

External links 

Frank Walshe's profile at Blueseum

1904 births
1962 deaths
Carlton Football Club players
Western Bulldogs players
Australian rules footballers from Victoria (Australia)
Coburg Football Club players